Mandarbaria Union is a union parishad situated at Maheshpur Upazila,  in Jhenaidah District, Khulna Division of Bangladesh. There are 22 villages and 18 mouzas in the union.

References

External links
 

Unions of Khulna Division
Unions of Maheshpur Upazila
Unions of Jhenaidah District